WHRT-FM is a non-commercial radio station licensed to Cokesbury, South Carolina, that broadcasts on a frequency of 91.9 MHz and covers Greenwood, Laurens, and Clinton.

Owned by Radio Training Network, it carries a Christian talk format branded as His Radio Talk, fed by WLFJ-HD4.

History
Oldies WKRI, along with WFBK Fort Mill, South Carolina and WKBR Summerville, South Carolina, was sold by Spirit Broadcasting Group Inc. for $460,832.

References

External links

HRT-FM
Radio stations established in 2011
2011 establishments in South Carolina